Tadeusz Jaczewski (1 February 1899, Saint Petersburg – 25 February 1974) was a Polish entomologist who specialised in Hemiptera.

Jaczewski studied at the Saint Petersburg State University, then taught at the University of Warsaw. He also worked for the Warsaw Zoological Museum. He published many papers on the insect fauna of Poland and with I.M Kerzhner 1964 wrote Order Hemiptera (Heteroptera). In Bei-Bienko, G. Ya. (ed.), Keys to the insects of the European USSR 1: 655-845 1964.He was a specialist in Nepomorpha

References
 Schuh, Randall,T and Slater,J.A. 1995 True bugs of the world (Hemiptera:Heteroptera) : classification and natural history Ithaca : Comstock Pub. Associates 

1899 births
1974 deaths
Polish entomologists
Scientists from Saint Petersburg
20th-century Polish zoologists